Nazar Ali Nazroo Narejo   was a notorious dacoit in Sindh, Pakistan. He was a symbol of terror for over two decades. He was held responsible and was charged for about 200 cases and was involved in plundering, highway robbery, kidnapping for ransom, murder and other crimes around the areas of Sindh and punjabi. The government announced a Rs. 20 million reward for his capture.

Early life 
Nazroo Narejo studied sociology at the University of Sindh, Jamshoro in the 1970s. He was a decent and intellectual student but due to his father's encounter with the shadow feudal system he turned to crime and made a stand against feudalism. 
His father had a master's degree in sociology as well as LL.B.

Death
Nazroo, along with his accomplices was killed in the Garhi Yaseen area of Shaikarpur in an encounter with Tanveer Ahmed Tunio, SSP of the Sukkur Region Sindh Police. His brother-in-law Sarwar, also known as Saroo Narejo and son Rab Rakhio Narejo were also killed during this operation. The operation claimed the lives of policemen Mujeeb Chachar and Haji Ismi Chachar.

Timeline 
In August 2013, a gang of dacoits led by Narejo fired rockets into the village of Mulla Ismail Khohro, resulting in the deaths of two men and a little girl in Khairpur.

See also
Bawarij

References

External links
Increased movement of bandits worries villagers
Nazro Narejo killing closed chapter - www.pressreader.com

1966 births
2015 deaths
Crime in Sindh
Male serial killers
Pakistani kidnappers
Pakistani serial killers
People shot dead by law enforcement officers in Pakistan
Sindhi people
University of Sindh alumni